The Adulteress is a 1973 drama film directed by Norbert Meisel and starring Eric Braeden, Tyne Daly, Gregory Morton, and Margaret Cook.

Premise
A couple cannot conceive a child and they hire a young drifter to solve their problem.

Cast
 Eric Braeden as Hank Baron
 Tyne Daly as Inez Steiner
 Gregory Morton as Carl Steiner
 Margaret Cook as Jessica
 Lynn Roth as Vikki
 Malek Paul Wazzan as Boy

References

External links 
 
 
 

1973 films
1973 drama films
Adultery in films
1970s English-language films